In marketing, lead generation is the initiation of consumer interest or enquiry into products or services of a business. A lead is the contact information and, in some cases, demographic information of a customer who is interested in a specific product or service.

Leads may come from various sources or activities, for example, digitally via the Internet, through personal referrals, through telephone calls either by the company or telemarketers, through advertisements, and events.

 In 2014, a study found that direct traffic, search engines, and web referrals were the three most popular online channels for lead generation, accounting for 93% of leads.
 In 2018, Chief Marketer found that B2B marketers favored email, live events, and content marketing as their top three.
 After the COVID-19 pandemic in 2020, Gartner identified increases in social and search engine optimization for B2B marketers, while B2C marketers favored digital advertising.

Lead generation is often paired with lead management to move leads through the purchase funnel. This combination of activities is referred to as pipeline marketing, which is often broken into a marketing and a sales pipeline.

Lead scoring 
Lead scoring is "an effective model that helps sales and marketing departments identify which prospects are potentially most valuable to the company and its current sales funnel." It involves a quantitative method of assigning a "score" to a lead to determine whether a lead is valid for a company's pipeline. When a lead reaches a certain score threshold, it is then sent from marketing to the sales team for examination. Assigns a numerical value to each lead based on factors such as their level of interest, fit with the company's target market, and likelihood of becoming a paying customer. This allows the call center to prioritize leads and allocate resources accordingly.

A lead is determined to be sales-ready through two criteria:
 Demographic criteria: Based on data points such as age, job title, and/or company information such as company size, revenue, etc.
 Behavioral criteria: Based on actions a lead has taken, such as clicking on a link in an email, watching a video, or visiting pages on a website.

Lead qualification statuses
In a database, typically a customer relationship management tool, leads are assigned a status. These statuses may vary by company, but some common terms are:

 Marketing qualified leads (MQLs) are leads that have typically come through inbound channels, such as Web Search or content marketing, and have expressed interest in a company's product or service. These leads have yet to interact with sales teams, but have met certain lead scoring criteria.
 Sales accepted leads (SALs) are MQLs that have been examined by a salesperson and deemed acceptable by sales for follow-up.
 Sales qualified leads (SQLs) are leads salespeople have interacted with and have identified as having an opportunity for a deal to be made. Qualifying criteria include need, budget, capacity, time-frame, interest, or authority to purchase, often referred to as BANT criteria.
 Accepted Sales Sold – The cycle does not stop as you should always be farming sales for additional work.

An Overview of Lead Generation 
Lead generation is the process of identifying and cultivating potential customer leads for a business. In a call center setting, this often involves making phone calls to potential customers in order to generate interest in the company's products or services.

One of the most important aspects of lead generation is targeting the right data. This means that the call center needs to have a clear understanding of the types of customers they are trying to reach and the most effective methods for reaching them. Accurate and up-to-date customer data is essential for successful lead generation, as it allows the call center to target the right individuals and businesses.

There are several ways that call centers can acquire and maintain high-quality data. One method is to purchase customer lists from reputable data providers. These lists can be filtered by various criteria such as industry, company size, and location, allowing the call center to focus on the most relevant potential leads.

Methods to Generate Leads 
Another way to acquire customer data is through inbound marketing efforts such as website forms, email campaigns, and social media interactions. By providing valuable content and resources to potential customers, businesses can encourage them to share their contact information in exchange for access to this content. This data can then be added to the call center's lead database.

Once the call center has a solid database of potential leads, it is important to use well-trained and skilled agents to make contact with these leads. These agents need to be able to effectively communicate the value of the company's products or services to potential customers and overcome any objections they may have. In order to do this, agents need to be knowledgeable about the company's offerings and have strong communication and sales skills.

Effective training and coaching can help ensure that agents are equipped with the necessary skills to succeed at lead generation. This can include role-playing exercises, sales training, and ongoing feedback and support from managers and peers. By investing in the development of their agents, call centers can improve the overall quality of their lead generation efforts.

In addition to having skilled agents, it is important for the call center to be efficient in its dialing strategy. This means that the call center needs to have a system in place for effectively reaching potential customers and maximizing the number of leads generated. This can include techniques such as predictive dialing, which uses algorithms to automatically dial phone numbers and connect agents with potential customers as soon as they become available.

Lead Generation Best Practices 
Other strategies for improving dialing efficiency may include call routing systems that direct calls to the most appropriate agents based on factors such as language proficiency and expertise in a specific product or service. Call centers can also use call tracking and analytics software to monitor the performance of their lead generation efforts and identify areas for improvement.

Lead quality assurance is another important aspect of lead generation in the call center. This involves confirming that leads meet certain criteria and are likely to be interested in the company's products or services. This can include verifying contact information, ensuring that leads are in the target market for the company's offerings, and confirming that leads have the budget and authority to make purchasing decisions.

There are several best practices for delivering leads to the appropriate teams or individuals within the organization. One method is to use a lead management system that tracks and routes leads in real-time, ensuring that they are promptly followed up on by the relevant sales or customer service team.

See also
 Direct marketing
 Direct selling
 Lead management
 Personal selling
 Sales
 Customer experience
 Outbound marketing 
 B2B marketing

References

Further reading 
 Lead Generation for the Complex Sale by Brian J. Carroll
 Marketing Management by Philip Kotler
 Marketing for Dummies

Sales
Customer relationship management
Personal selling
Search engine optimization